Palavarasan  is a village in the  
Avadaiyarkoilrevenue block of Pudukkottai district, Tamil Nadu, India.

Demographics 

As per the 2001 census, Palavarasan had a total population of 97 with 51 males and 46 females. Out of the total population 71 people were literate.

References

Villages in Pudukkottai district